Bayram (also Romanized as Bāyrām) is a village in Bavil Rural District of the Central District of Osku County, East Azerbaijan province, Iran. At the 2006 National Census, its population was 2,671 in 771 households. The following census in 2011 counted 2,815 people in 856 households. The latest census in 2016 showed a population of 2,982 people in 977 households; it was the largest village in its rural district.

References 

Osku County

Populated places in East Azerbaijan Province

Populated places in Osku County